Nital is a solution of nitric acid and alcohol commonly used for etching of metals. It is especially suitable for revealing the microstructure of carbon steels. The alcohol can be methanol, ethanol or methylated spirits.

Mixtures of ethanol and nitric acid are potentially explosive. This commonly occurs by gas evolution, although ethyl nitrate can also be formed. Methanol is not liable to explosion but it is toxic.

A solution of ethanol and nitric acid will become explosive if the concentration of nitric acid reaches over 10% (by weight). Solutions above 5% should not be stored in closed containers. Nitric acid will continue to act as an oxidant in dilute and cold conditions.

In popular culture 
Nital is a critical plot element in the Japanese manga series Dr. Stone, whose story resolves around the mysterious petrification of all mankind. Made from nitric acid that they produce from Bat Guano found in a cave and highly distilled alcohol with a ratio of 3:7, nital is dubbed the revival fluid with the unique property of undoing and freeing the petrified people.

References 

Etching
Solutions